The Cabinet Division  is the executive office of the Prime Minister of Bangladesh. As a division of the Government of Bangladesh, the office is responsible for the executive administration of the government and facilitating smooth transaction of business in Cabinet Ministries. The division assists in decision-making in government by ensuring inter-ministerial coordination, ironing out differences amongst ministries/departments and evolving consensus through the instrumentality of the standing/ad hoc committees of secretaries. The Cabinet Secretary who is assisted by seven Additional Secretaries in the performance of assigned business heads the Cabinet Division under the Prime Minister as the Minister In-charge.

History 
In 1972, the Ministry of Cabinet Affairs was created to provide secretarial assistance to the government of Bangladesh. After 1975, it was placed under President's Office.

After 1991, the presidential system of government by Act of Parliament was abolished, and by October 1991, Cabinet Division was formed as a full-fledged administrative unit.

Functions
The Cabinet Division is responsible for writing and maintaining the Secretariat Instructions. This document outlines how ministries and divisions should interact with each other. Its purpose is "to ensure uniformity and efficiency in the observance of administrative practices and procedures". It supplements the Rules of Business, and all business of government is to be transacted in accordance with these two instruments. The secretary (the senior civil servant) in each ministry and division is responsible for ensuring the Secretariat Instructions are followed.

See also 

 Cabinet of Bangladesh

References 

Government agencies of Bangladesh
Government divisions of Bangladesh